The Magallanes Basin or Austral Basin is a major sedimentary basin in southern Patagonia. The basin is bounded to the west by the Andes mountains and is separated from the Malvinas Basin to the east by the Río Chico-Dungeness High. The basin evolved from being an extensional back-arc basin in the Mesozoic to being a compressional foreland basin in the Cenozoic. Rocks within the basin are Jurassic in age and include the Cerro Toro Formation. Three ages of the SALMA classification are defined in the basin; the Early Miocene Santacrucian from the Santa Cruz Formation and Friasian from the Río Frías Formation and the Pleistocene Ensenadan from the La Ensenada Formation.

The Magallanes Basin contains most of Chile's coal reserves dwarfing those found in the Arauco Basin or around Valdivia (e.g. Catamutún, Mulpún). Its coals are lignitic to sub-bituminous.

Stratigraphy

Aysén Basin 
The northwesternmost reaches of the basin form a sub-basin known as Aysén Basin or Río Mayo Embayment. From top to bottom the fill the basin is:
 Río Frías Formation (Friasian)
 Río Baguales Formation (Deseadan)
 Late Cretaceous volcanic rock
 Divisadero Group (Aptian to Albian)
 Coihaique Group (Late Jurassic to Aptian)
 Apeleg Formation
 Katterfeld Formation
 Toqui Formation (Tithonian)
 Ibáñez Formation

Northwestern basin 
In the Argentinian parts of the basin, the following formations have been registered from north to south:
 Santa Cruz Formation (Santacrucian)
 Cerro Boleadoras Formation (Santacrucian)
 Río Jeinemeni Formation (Colhuehuapian)
 Monte León Formation (Deseadan to Colhuehuapian)
 San Julián Formation (Late Eocene to Early Miocene)
 Campo Bola Formation
 Asunción Formation
 Cardiel Formation (Maastrichtian)
 Mata Amarilla Formation (Albian to Santonian)
 Piedra Clavada Formation (Albian)
 Kachaike Formation (Aptian to Cenomanian)
 Río Tarde Formation
 Apeleg Formation
 Cerro Toro Formation (Turonian)
 Divisadero Group (Aptian to Albian)
 Río Belgrano Formation (Barremian to Aptian)
 Springhill Formation (Valanginian to Hauterivian)
 El Tranquilo Group (Late Triassic)
 Laguna Colorada Formation (Norian)

South-central basin  
 La Ensenada Formation (Ensenadan)
 Cordillera Chica Formation
 Pinturas Formation (Santacrucian)
 Santa Cruz Formation (Santacrucian)
 Centinela Formation (Middle Eocene)
 Río Leona Formation
 Río Guillero Formation
 Man Aike Formation (Middle Eocene)
 Río Turbio Formation (Early to Late Eocene)
 Calafate Formation
 Cerro Dorotea Formation
 Chorrillo Formation (Maastrichtian)
 La Irene Formation (Maastrichtian)
 Monte Chico Formation (Maastrichtian)
 Cerro Fortaleza Formation (Cenomanian)
 Anita Formation
 Cerro Cazador Formation (Campanian to Maastrichtian)
 Alta Vista Formation (Early to Middle Campanian)
 Lago Sofía Formation
 Cerro Toro Formation (Turonian to Santonian)
 Río Mayer Formation (early Hauterivian to early Albian)
 Zapata Formation (Berriasian to Hauterivian)
 Springhill Formation (Berriasian to Barremian)
 Tobífera Formation (Late Jurassic)

Tierra del Fuego 
 Irigoyen Formation
 Punta Basílica Formation
 Castillo Formation
 Loreto Formation (Priabonian - Divisaderan to Tinguirirican)
 Cabo Peña Formation
 Tchat Chii Formation
 Cerro Colorado Formation
 Leticia Formation (Bartonian)
 Punta Torcida Formation
 Arroyo Candelaria Formation
 Río Claro Formation
 Policarpo Formation
 Bahía Thetis Formation
 Cabeza de León Formation
 Arroyo Alfa Formation
 Yahgan Formation
 Beauvoir Formation (Albian)
 Nueva Argentina Formation
 Lemaire Formation
 Pampa Rincón Formation (Barremian to Aptian)
 Chon Aike Formation (Middle Jurassic to Berriasian)

See also 
 Cerro Benitez
 Turbio River
 Golfo San Jorge Basin
 Rocas Verdes ophiolites

Notes

References

Bibliography 
Cretaceous
 

Neogene

Further reading 
 
 
 
  

Sedimentary basins of Argentina
Sedimentary basins of Chile
Foreland basins